Warnakula Patabandige Rodney Priyantha Perera, (born 24 April 1961 as රොඩ්නි වර්ණකුල) [Sinhala]), popularly known as Rodney Warnakula, is a Sri Lankan actor, comedian, singer, and dubbing artist.

Family
Warnakula was born on 24 April 1961 in Ja-Ela, as the son of Aloy Warnakula, an actor, and Annie Jayakodi, a housewife. He made his stage debut in Lucien Bulathsinhala’s 1981 drama Tharavo Igilethi. He is married to Erani Warnakula. They have two daughters and a son. His elder daughter Harshani Prasangika is a dancing teacher, his second daughter is Samadhi Upekshika and his youngest is his son, Eron Lakdeepa.

Career
In 1980, The Tower Foundation conducts a drama course with lecturers from Shanti Niketan, India by selecting 100 participants. Warnakula was selected for that group and successfully completed the course. Later one of the lecturers in the course, Anula Bulathsinhala invited him to participate for the stage play Tharavo Igilethi.

Warnakula has performed in over fifty stage plays, fifteen teleplays and twenty films, in addition to being a popular television actor. His most popular television acting came from Bodima and Nonavaruni Mahathvaruni. He also hosted Raigam Game Show several times which was telecasted on ITN. He and actor Rodney Fraser appeared together in the comedy series Two Rodneys, which was telecast on Sirasa TV. Warnakula has also enjoyed a lengthy singing career.

On 20 October 2011, Warnakula organized a musical night Sanda Eliyen Ada, to celebrate his 30 years of acting career. On that day, he launched his new music DVD, and the show was celebrated at the New Hall of Royal College, Colombo. On 18 May 2018, Warnakula organized a singing concert named Three Faces along with Kumara Thirimadura and Saman Lenin to celebrate his 37 years of stage drama career. The show will be held at the BMICH.

In 2020 during the CoVID-19 quarantine curfew period, his Facebook account has been hacked. Then, his Facebook friends and fans received messages asking for money by saying that he has a critical money emergency. However, Warnakula got informed about the hacker and sent messages not to give money. Later Warnakula made a new Facebook page. To celebrate his 40 years of drama career, he wrote his autobiography titled "Roddage Warna Kulaya".

Selected television serials
 Alli and Galli 
 Bodima
 Dara Garage
 Dese Disnaya
 E Brain
 Laa Sanda Pamula 
 Love You Boss
 Naana Kamare 
 Nonavaruni Mahathvaruni
 On Ataka Nataka
 Raja Kaduwa
 Satakapata
 Sayaweni Patumaga 
 Sedona
 Vinoda Samayan
 Wada Bari Daasa

Selected stage dramas
Gajaman Puwatha 
 Gondola
Naribana with Jasaya Saha Lenchina 
 Madhura Javanika
 Minisa
 Naribana
 Saaranga Nawen Awith
 Sakisanda Madala
 Sudu Redi Horu
 Tharavo Igilethi

Filmography

Discography

Solo Tracks

References

External links
Rodney - Priyantha - Giriraj Funny
වගකීම බින්දුවයි
ඡන්ද 4 ක්ද?
රොඩිනි මෙහෙමයි බවලතා අරන් ආවේ

Sri Lankan male film actors
Sinhalese male actors
Living people
1969 births
Sri Lankan male television actors